Martin Young (born 5 July 1947) is a television reporter and interviewer.

Born in Glasgow, he attended Dulwich College and Caius College, Cambridge where he was President of the Marlowe Society and a member of Footlights.

Young began his career as a researcher for Border Television in 1969, and became a reporter/presenter for Tyne Tees Television in 1970 before joining BBC Look North. In 1973, he joined Nationwide, going on to work on both Newsnight and Panorama. In 1980 he helped to found the award-winning programme Rough Justice which led to the release of five people on murder and serious assault charges. This work formed the basis of two books: Rough Justice and More Rough Justice, co-authored with Peter Hill.  In 1986 he and the producer, Peter Hill, were suspended from the BBC for three months and barred from working on investigative programmes for two years after being found to have made 'unjustifiable threats' to make an interviewee withdraw allegations which had led to a conviction.

He co-presented the Midday News programme on LBC Newstalk 97.3 FM on London's news station, alongside Brian Widlake. He has also worked on BBC Radio 4 hosting the panel game Who Goes There?, guested on the first three series of Have I Got News for You, and is now a Media Trainer.

References

External links

Young,Martin
Living people
Young,Martin
Young,Martin
People educated at Dulwich College